Drenge may refer to:

Boys (1977 film), a 1977 Danish film, originally Drenge
Drenge (band), a band formed in 2011 in Castleton, Derbyshire
 Drenge (album)